Paul Howard Douglas (March 26, 1892 – September 24, 1976) was an American politician and Georgist economist. A member of the Democratic Party, he served as a U.S. Senator from Illinois for eighteen years, from 1949 to 1967. During his Senate career, he was a prominent member of the liberal coalition.

Born in Massachusetts and raised in Maine, Douglas graduated from Bowdoin College and Columbia University. He served as a professor of economics at several schools, most notably the University of Chicago, and earned a reputation as a reformer while a member of the Chicago City Council (1939–1942). During World War II, he served in the U.S. Marine Corps, rising to the rank of lieutenant colonel and becoming known as a war hero.

He was married to Emily Taft Douglas, a U.S. Representative from Illinois's At-large district (1945–1947).

Early years 
Douglas was born on March 26, 1892, in Salem, Massachusetts, the son of Annie (Smith) and James Howard Douglas. When he was four, his mother died of natural causes and his father remarried. His father was an abusive husband and his stepmother, unable to obtain a divorce, left her husband and took Douglas and his older brother to Onawa, Maine, in Piscataquis County, where her brother and uncle had built a resort in the woods.

Academia and family life 
Douglas graduated from Bowdoin College with a Phi Beta Kappa key in 1913. He then moved on to Columbia University, where he earned a master's degree in 1915 and a Ph.D. in economics in 1921. In 1915, he married Dorothy Wolff, a graduate of Bryn Mawr College who also earned a Ph.D. at Columbia University.

From 1915 to 1920, the Douglases moved six times. He studied at Harvard University; taught at the University of Illinois and at Oregon's Reed College; served as a mediator of labor disputes for the Emergency Fleet Corporation of Pennsylvania; and taught at the University of Washington.  When working for the Emergency Fleet Corporation, he read John Woolman's journals.  When teaching in Seattle, he joined the Religious Society of Friends.

In 1919, Douglas took a job teaching economics at the University of Chicago. Although Douglas enjoyed his job, his wife was unable to obtain a job at the university due to anti-nepotism rules. When she obtained a job at Smith College, in Massachusetts, she persuaded her husband to move the family there. He would then start teaching at Amherst College. In 1930 the couple divorced; Dorothy Wolff Douglas began a romantic relationship with Katharine DuPre Lumpkin.  Dorothy took custody of their four children, and Douglas returned to Chicago. The following year, Douglas met and married Emily Taft Douglas, daughter of sculptor Lorado Taft and a distant cousin of former president William Howard Taft.  Emily was a political activist, former actress, and subsequent one-term congresswoman at-large from Illinois (1945–47).

Douglas was listed as a supporter of banking reforms suggested by University of Chicago economists in 1933 that were later referred to as the "Chicago plan." In 1939, he coauthored with five other notable economists a draft proposal titled A Program for Monetary Reform. The Chicago plan and A Program for Monetary Reform generated much interest and discussion among lawmakers, but the suggested reforms did not result in any new legislation.

Douglas is probably best known to economics students as the co-author of the 1928 article with Charles Cobb that first laid out the Cobb-Douglas production function.

Government service and city politics 
As the 1920s drew to a close, Douglas got more involved in politics. He served as an economic advisor to Republican Governor Gifford Pinchot of Pennsylvania and Democratic Governor Franklin D. Roosevelt of New York. Along with Chicago lawyer Harold L. Ickes, he launched a campaign against public utility tycoon Samuel Insull's stock market manipulations. Working with the state legislature, he helped draft laws regulating utilities and establishing old-age pensions and unemployment insurance. By the early 1930s, he was vice chairman of the League for Independent Political Action, a member of the Farmer-Labor Party's national committee, and treasurer of the American Commonwealth Political Federation.

A registered Independent, Douglas felt that the Democratic Party was too corrupt and the Republican Party was too reactionary, views that he expressed in a 1932 book, The Coming of a New Party, in which he supported the creation of a party similar to the British Labour Party. That year, he supported Socialist candidate Norman Thomas for President of the United States.

After Roosevelt's victory in the election, Douglas, at the recommendation of his friend Harold Ickes, was appointed to serve on the Consumers' Advisory Board of the National Recovery Administration. In 1935, however, the Supreme Court ruled that the Administration was unconstitutional, and it was abolished.

That year, Douglas made his first foray into electoral politics, campaigning for the endorsement of the local Republican Party for mayor of Chicago. Although the party endorsed someone else, Douglas continued to work with them to get their candidate elected to the city council from the 5th Ward. A strong Socialist candidate split the reform vote, however, and Democratic Party candidate James Cusack was elected.

Four years later, in 1939, Cusack came up for re-election, and Douglas joined a group of reform-minded Independents that drafted Douglas. During the municipal election cycle, Mayor Edward Joseph Kelly was challenged for re-election and attempted to shore up his reputation by lending his support to Douglas' campaign. With Kelly's help and his own dogged campaigning, Douglas managed a narrow victory over Cusack in a runoff election.

Douglas usually found himself in the minority in the Chicago City Council. His attempts to reform the public education system and lower public transportation fares were met with derision and he typically ended up on the losing end of 49–1 votes. "I have three degrees," Douglas once said after a particularly hard-fought rout. "I have been associated with intelligent and intellectual people for many years. Some of these aldermen haven't gone through the fifth grade. But they're the smartest bunch of bastards I ever saw grouped together."

In 1942, Douglas joined the Democratic Party and ran for its nomination for the United States Senate. He had the support of a cadre of left-wing activists, but the machine supported the state's at-large Congressman Raymond S. McKeough for the nomination. On the day of the primary, Douglas carried 99 of the state's 102 counties, but McKeough's strong support in Cook County allowed him to win a slim majority. He would go on to lose in the general election to incumbent Republican senator C. Wayland Brooks.

Military service 
As alderman, Douglas had worked with Chicago Daily News publisher Frank Knox in fighting corruption in Chicago.  Knox, who had been Republican vice-presidential nominee in 1936, had become Secretary of the Navy, thus responsible for both the navy and the Marine Corps.

Shortly after losing the primary, Douglas resigned from the Chicago City Council. With the aid of Knox, Douglas enlisted in the United States Marine Corps on May 15, 1942, at the age of 50, becoming the oldest recruit in the history of Parris Island. Entering service as a private, Douglas was placed in an ordinary platoon and received no waivers aside from his teeth and eyesight. As a member of the 57th Street Meeting of the Quakers, Douglas recognized that joining the Marines was contrary to the traditional testimony of that group against war and offered to resign his membership; the meeting refused to release him. Initially, Douglas was kept stateside, writing training manuals and giving inspirational speeches to troops, and quickly rose to the rank of staff sergeant. With the aid of Knox and his assistant Adlai Stevenson, Douglas was commissioned as a captain on November 24, 1942. Requesting combat duty, he was subsequently sent to the Pacific theater of operations with the 1st Marine Division.

During the Battle of Peleliu, Douglas initially served as an adjutant in the 1st Marine Division headquarters before being assigned R-1 (personnel officer) of the 5th Marine Regiment. On the second day of the battle, Captain Douglas received permission to head to the front where he found work as a mobile regimental troubleshooter. He earned a Bronze Star for carrying ammunition to the front lines under enemy fire and earned his first Purple Heart when he was grazed by shrapnel while carrying flamethrower ammunition to the front lines. In that six-week battle, while investigating some random fire shootings, Douglas was shot at as he uncovered a two-foot-wide cave.  He then killed the Japanese soldier inside at which point he wondered whether his enemy might be an economics professor from the University of Tokyo.

Shortly after returning to Pavuvu, Douglas received notice that his wife, Emily Taft Douglas won the election for Illinois's at-large congressional district.

A few months later, during the Battle of Okinawa, Douglas earned his second Purple Heart. A volunteer rifleman in an infantry platoon, he was helping to carry wounded from 3rd Battalion 5th Marines along the Naha-Shuri line when a burst of machine gun fire tore through his left arm, severing the main nerve and leaving it permanently disabled.

After a thirteen-month stay in the National Naval Medical Center at Bethesda, Maryland, Douglas was given an honorable discharge as a lieutenant colonel with full disability pay.

Return to civilian life 
After Douglas left the service he returned to teach at the University of Chicago around 1946. In 1947 he was awarded the highest honor in the economics profession when he was elected president of the American Economic Association. But soon Douglas found himself at odds with the faculty at Chicago, stating, "... I was disconcerted to find that the economic and political conservatives had acquired almost complete dominance over my department and taught that market decisions were always right and profit values the supreme ones ... If I stayed, it would be in an unfriendly environment." Unhappy with the situation at the university, Paul turned his attention to Illinois politics.

Senate campaign 

While Douglas had been serving in the Marines, his wife, Emily, had been nominated to run against isolationist Republican Congressman Stephen A. Day, who had succeeded McKeough. Although she had defeated Day in the 1944 election, a Republican upsurge had unseated her in 1946, the same year that Douglas left the Marines.

Deciding to enter politics once again, Douglas let it be generally known that he wished to seek the office of Governor of Illinois in 1948. Cook County machine boss Jacob Arvey, however, had a different plan. At the time, several scandals had broken out over the machine's activities, and Arvey decided that Douglas, a scholar and war hero with a reputation for incorruptibility, would be the perfect nominee to run against Senator Brooks. Since Brooks was hugely popular in the state and had a large campaign warchest, Arvey decided that there was no danger of Douglas winning.  The top two thirds of the Illinois Democratic slate for the 1948 election then became Paul Douglas for senator and Adlai Stevenson for governor.

At the outset of the campaign, Douglas' chances looked slim. As a delegate to the 1948 Democratic National Convention, he had tried to draft General Dwight D. Eisenhower for president, calling President Harry S. Truman "incompetent."

Douglas, however, proved to be a tenacious campaigner. He stumped across the state in a Jeep station wagon for the Marshall Plan, civil rights, repeal of the Taft-Hartley Act, more public housing, and more social security programs. During six months of non-stop campaigning, he traveled more than  around the state and delivered more than 1,100 speeches. When Senator Brooks refused to debate him, Douglas debated an empty chair, switching from seat to seat as he provided both his and Brooks' answers.

On Election Day, Douglas won an upset victory, taking 55 percent of the vote and defeating the incumbent by a margin of more than 407,000 votes. Stevenson won the race for governor by a wide margin, but there was no coattails effect from president to senator to governor, as President Truman, campaigning for re-election, won the state by a slim 33,600 votes.

Senator 

As senator, Douglas soon earned a reputation as an unconventional liberal, concerned as much with fiscal discipline as with passing the Fair Deal. He was also a passionate crusader for civil rights (Dr. Martin Luther King Jr. described him as "the greatest of all the Senators"). At the opening of the 85th United States Congress in January 1957, a session that would see the passing of the Civil Rights Act of 1957 in September, Douglas was the only senator to defy custom and vote against the confirmation of racist James Eastland as the chairman of the Judiciary Committee.

Douglas also earned fame as an opponent of pork barrel spending. Early in his first term, he grabbed headlines when, magnifying glass and atlas in hand, he strode to the Senate floor and, referring to a pork barrel project for the dredging of the Josias river in Maine, defied anyone to find the river in the atlas. When Maine's Owen Brewster objected and pointed out the millions of dollars in pork going to Illinois, Douglas offered to cut his state's share by 40%.

Appointed to chair the Joint Economic Committee, Douglas led a series of hard-hitting investigations into fiscal mismanagement in government and appeared on the cover of Time for January 22, 1951. A profile of him in that issue was entitled "The Making of a Maverick."
In 1952 he was elected as a Fellow of the American Statistical Association.

As the 1952 presidential election approached, a groundswell of support arose for a Douglas candidacy for president. The National Editorial Association ranked him the second-most-qualified man, after Truman, to receive the Democratic presidential nomination, and a poll of 46 Democratic insiders revealed him to be a favorite for the nomination if Truman stepped aside.

Douglas, however, refused to be considered as a candidate for president, instead backing the candidacy of Senator Estes Kefauver of Tennessee, a folksy, coonskin cap-wearing populist who had become famous for his televised investigations into organized crime. Douglas stumped across the country for Kefauver and stood next to him at the 1952 Democratic National Convention when Kefauver was defeated by Illinois Governor Adlai Stevenson II. Four years later, in 1956, he remained publicly neutral, feeling that openly opposing Stevenson's drive for the nomination and supporting Kefauver would damage his standing with his state party.

In addition to his battles for equal rights for African Americans and less pork barrel spending, Douglas was also known for his fights for environmental protection, public housing, and truth in lending laws. He opposed real estate redlining but was forced to allow a 1949 provision in a public housing bill making it possible for suburbs to reject low-income housing. He also authored the Consumer Credit Protection Act, a bill that forced lenders to state the terms of a loan in plain language and restricted the ability of lenders to discriminate on the basis of gender, race, or income. Although the bill was not passed during his term of office, it became law in 1968.

As a believer in Georgist economics, Douglas regretting not being able to do more to advance land value tax while in the Senate. Douglas told Mason Gaffney that he even regretted leaving local politics, where he saw more opportunity to implement Georgist ideas. In his memoirs, Douglas perhaps jokingly asked Saint Paul to forgive him for his silence in the Senate on what he considered to be the important land values problem.

Douglas was an ardent supporter of the disproven cancer drug Krebiozen, and in the early 1960s sponsored senate hearings in support of the discredited treatment.

Defeat and retirement 
During the 1966 election, Douglas, then 74, ran for a fourth term in office against Republican Charles H. Percy, a wealthy businessman and former student of his. A confluence of events, including Douglas's age and sympathy for Percy over the then-recent and presently still unsolved murder of his daughter, Valerie, caused Douglas to lose the election in an upset.

After losing his seat in the Senate, Douglas taught at the New School, chaired a commission on housing, and wrote books, including an autobiography, In the Fullness of Time.

In the early 1970s, he suffered a stroke and withdrew from public life. On September 24, 1976, he died at his home. He was cremated and his ashes were scattered in Jackson Park near the University of Chicago.

Memorial 
A memorial marker at the Marine Corps training base at Parris Island reads:

From 1986 to 1997, the U.S. Department of Education awarded the Paul Douglas Teacher Scholarship in Douglas's honor.

In 1992 the University of Illinois, Institute of Government and Public Affairs established the Paul H. Douglas Award for Ethics in Government as part of the celebration of the senator's 100th birthday, and in recognition of his outstanding service to the nation.

The Paul Douglas Forest Preserve in Hoffman Estates, Illinois is named for him.

Awards and Honors 

Douglas was entitled to campaign participation credit ("battle stars") for Capture and Occupation of the Southern Palau Islands (Peleliu), and Assault and Occupation of Okinawa Gunto

Douglas was elected to the American Academy of Arts and Sciences in 1950 and the American Philosophical Society in 1952.

See also 

 Douglas, A Program for Monetary Reform (1939)

Notes

References 

 Biles, Roger. Crusading Liberal: Paul H. Douglas of Illinois (2002), the standard scholarly biography
 Biles, Roger. "Paul H Douglas, McCarthyism and the Senatorial Election of 1954," Journal of the Illinois State Historical Society 95#1 2002. pp 52+.

 Hartley, Robert E. Battleground 1948: Truman, Stevenson, Douglas, and the Most Surprising Election in Illinois History (Southern Illinois University Press; 2013)

External links 

 Biographical Essay from University of Chicago
  Link to U. of Illinois Paul Douglas Ethics in Government Award 
 A collection of letters and works written by Paul Douglas
 Guide to the Paul H. Douglas Papers 1938–1946 at the University of Chicago Special Collections Research Center

1892 births
1976 deaths
Economists from Illinois
United States Marine Corps personnel of World War II
American Quakers
Columbia Graduate School of Arts and Sciences alumni
Bowdoin College alumni
Fellows of the American Statistical Association
Harvard University alumni
National Recovery Administration
People from Champaign County, Illinois
Politicians from Salem, Massachusetts
People from Piscataquis County, Maine
Spouses of Illinois politicians
United States Marine Corps colonels
Candidates in the 1956 United States presidential election
20th-century American politicians
Chicago City Council members
University of Chicago faculty
Reed College faculty
Writers about the Soviet Union
Democratic Party United States senators from Illinois
Illinois Democrats
Illinois Farmer–Laborites
American Unitarians
American Unitarian Universalists
Fellows of the Econometric Society
Presidents of the American Economic Association
Mathematicians from Illinois
Economists from Massachusetts
20th-century American economists
Economists from Maine
Georgist economists
United Service Organizations entertainers
Members of the American Philosophical Society